Fuerzas Populares Revolucionarias Lorenzo Zelaya (Revolutionary Popular Forces Lorenzo Zelaya), was a clandestine politico-military movement in Honduras. FPRLZ was formed in 1980 by dissidents of PCMLH. FPRLZ was inspired by the Nicaraguan Revolution of 1979, and unlike the traditional communist parties (the PCH and PCMLH), FPRLZ advocated guerrilla struggle.

FPRLZ maintained relations with Salvadoran Fuerzas Populares de Liberación, and later with FMLN when the front was more consolidated. In 1990 FPRLZ merged with other tendencies to form Partido Renovación Patriótica.

FPRLZ was named after the peasants leader Lorenzo Zelaya, who was murdered in 1965.

Communism in Honduras
Defunct political parties in Honduras
Guerrilla movements in Latin America
Paramilitary organizations based in Honduras